Sachicasaurus is an extinct genus of brachauchenine pliosaurid known from the Barremian of the Paja Formation, Altiplano Cundiboyacense in the Colombian Eastern Ranges of the Andes. The type species is S. vitae.

Etymology 
The genus name Sachicasaurus refers to Sáchica, the village where the fossil was found, and saurus, meaning "lizard" in Latinised Greek. The species epithet vitae, meaning "of life" in Latin, was chosen because of the life in Sáchica the fossil find has sparked.

Description 

The holotype specimen, MP111209-1, was found in 2013 and is known from a near complete skull, and postcranial elements including a complete hindlimb and various vertebrae. Diagnostic features include a very short mandibular symphysis, reduced number of mandibular teeth (17 to 18 versus 25 to 40 in other pliosaurids), slender teeth, among other features. With the preserved length estimated at almost , the specimen is interpreted as a sub-adult individual.

Paleoenvironment 
Sachicasaurus is one of four pliosaurids from the Paja Formation, others being Acostasaurus, Stenorhynchosaurus, and Monquirasaurus. It is also contemporaneous with the elasmosaurids Callawayasaurus and Leivanectes, the marine turtle Desmatochelys padillai, the sandowniid turtle Leyvachelys, and the ophthalmosaurid ichthyosaurs Muiscasaurus and Kyhytysuka.

References

Bibliography 
Sachicasaurus
 

Other paleofauna
 
 
 
 
 
 

Pliosaurids
Early Cretaceous reptiles of South America
Barremian life
Cretaceous Colombia
Fossils of Colombia
Paja Formation
Fossil taxa described in 2018
Taxa named by María Páramo
Muysccubun
Sauropterygian genera